The USA International Ballet Competition, or USA IBC, is one of the world's top competitions for ballet. Located in Jackson, Mississippi, this competition is attended by dancers from all over the world to represent their country for bronze, silver, or gold medals in a variety of categories of ballet in an Olympic-style competition.

Founded in 1978 by Thalia Mara, the first USA International Ballet Competition took place in 1979. This first competition was given sanction by the United Nations' International Dance Committee of UNESCO's International Theatre Institute.

In 1982, the United States Congress passed a Joint resolution designating Jackson, Mississippi, as the official home of the USA International Ballet Competition. Competitions occur every four years in Olympic style.

History

The International Ballet Competition (IBC) originated in Varna, Bulgaria in 1964. The competition eventually expanded to rotating annual events in Varna, Moscow and Tokyo. In 1979 the event first came to the United States in Jackson, Mississippi, where it now returns every four years. The rotation is currently among Jackson, Varna, New York, Helsinki, and Shanghai. A number of other international competitions are also sanctioned by UNESCO International Dance Council.

After a distinguished career as a teacher in New York City, Thalia Mara moved to Jackson, Mississippi, to start a new professional company. That company has transitioned through the years and is now Ballet Mississippi and is under the direction of David Keary. In the late 1970s a group in New York City was looking for a site to hold an international competition in the United States. Thalia Mara successfully lobbied for Jackson as the site because it would give the competitors a taste of Middle America and it would help build interest in the ballet for her struggling new company. When asked why the competition was held in Mississippi, Bruce Marks said "New York is New York but Jackson is America."

Ms. Mara put together an organization to raise funds and run the event.  Hundreds of local volunteers supplemented the paid staff that first year.  Capitalizing on the popularity of local sports the competition was marketed as the Olympics of Ballet.  That first competition in 1979 faced an extra hurdle when the Jackson Municipal Auditorium was flooded just months before the competition. The last two weeks of June saw 70 dancers from 15 countries competing in front of several sold-out performances.

After this first event the International Dance Committee of the International Theatre Institute of UNESCO sanctioned the competition. Just before the Second USA IBC in 1982 the United States Congress passed a Joint Resolution designating Jackson as the official home of the IBC.

This first USA IBC added several features that were not found in other competitions. Participants were invited to remain after elimination and encouraged to dance in a special performance at the awards gala.  Every competitor and judge was paired with a local host family.  A dance school was held concurrently with the competition so students could attend class with world class instructors during the day and attend the competition each night.

In 1994 the performance hall in Jackson, Mississippi where the USA IBC is held was renamed in honor of Thalia Mara.  She died in Jackson on October 8, 2003.

Rules
Applicants are required to submit a resume and a video.  A selection committee invites about 100 of the applicants to compete as either a junior (15 to 18) or a senior (19 - 26). Accepted competitors are provided a list of classical pieces from which to select their competition performances.  Competition is for a gold, silver, and bronze medals for men and women in each of the age categories.  Judges do not have to award every medal and sometimes multiple dancers receive a silver or bronze medal.  There are additional awards for best couple, The Robert Joffrey Memorial award and awards of encouragement for juniors. A choreography award is given to the best contemporary piece performed in the competition.

The competition consists of three rounds. In the first round each competitor must perform one classical pax de deux or two short solos. At the end of the first round about half of the competitors are selected to continue to the next round. The second round is for contemporary dance. Second round competitors are selected for the final round based on their scores in the first two rounds. In the final round each competitor must perform both a classical or contemporary piece. The medals are determined from the third round scores.

There are thirteen jurors and no country is allowed to have more than one jury member. Jurors score each dancer individually based on artistry, technical skill and musicality. Eliminated competitors are allowed a private session with a jury member to review results.

Previous participants
The USA IBC has accelerated the careers of many dancers including Jose Manuel Carreño (1990), Nina Ananiashvili (1986), Vadim Pisarev (1986), Andris Liepa (1986), Daniel Meja (1986), Rasta Thomas (1998), Vladimir Malakhov (1990), Irina Dvorovenko (1990), Brooklyn Mack 2006, Daniil Simkin (2006), Misa Kuranaga (2006), Sara Webb (2002), Katia Carranza (2002), Anna Antonicheva (1998), Yury & Zenaida Yanowsky (1994), Johan Kobborg (1994), April & Simon Ball (1994), Luis Serrano (1998), Dai Sasaki (1994), Edward Stierle (1986), Li Cunxin (1982) and Katherine Healy (1982).

Jury members have included Robert Joffrey, Yuri Grigorovich, Bruce Marks, Sophia Golovkina, Alexander Grant, Vera Kirova,  Ivan Nagy, Laura Alonso, Vladimir Vasiliev, Yvette Chauvrire and Nina Novak.

Li Cunxin (senior men's silver medal in 1982) wrote a memoir Mao's Last Dancer that was a best seller in Australia and the United Kingdom.  It includes his account of the competition in Jackson where he was not allowed to compete as a Chinese citizen because of his recent defection to the US.  He also discusses the intrigue around the defection of Chinese dancer Lin Jianwei during the competition that year. A movie based on the book was released in 2009. Today Li lives with his family in Melbourne, Australia.

The first gold medalist at a USA IBC was Lubomir Kafka from Czechoslovakia in 1979.  The first US representative to win a gold medal was Janie Parker with the Houston Ballet in 1982.  The only medalist from the IBC's home town of Jackson was Kathy Thibodeaux in 1982.

Numerous dancers have participated in multiple USA IBCs but only Pierre Quinn from Bluffers Park in Canada has won medals in different IBCs — junior silver in 1982 and senior silver in 1990.  Simon Ball came close when he won a Jury award as a junior in 1990 and won the gold medal as a junior in 1994.

A number of brother-sister pairs have been in the competition.  The most successful was Yury and Zenaida Yanowsky (Spain, 1994, silver and gold respectively). April and Simon Ball (USA) also won awards as a brother-sister pair that same year.

Notable sisters have also passed through the IBC including Jennifer and Lauren Gelfand (U.S., 1986 and 1990 respectively) and Adrienne and Ashley Canterna (USA, 1998 and 2002).  Brothers Zoltan and Tamas Solymosi (Hungary, 1986 and 1990) went on to dance at the Royal Ballet in London and the American Ballet Theater, respectively. Another pair of brothers were Isaac Hernandez from Mexico who won a Senior Gold medal in 2006 and Esteban Hernandez with a Junior Jury Award of Encouragement in 2010.

The 2010 competition brought us the first father-son participants with Andrei Pisarev of Ukraine who is the son of Vadim Pisarev that won a gold medal for the USSR in 1986.

2014 Competition 
The USA IBC was again held in Jackson, Mississippi, from June 14 to 29, 2014. There were 109 competitors accepted from 21 countries.  This year Edward Villella was the jury chairman for the first time and there were two jury members that were previous medalists: Nina Ananiashvili (1986 Senior Grand Prix) and Gigi Hyatt (1982 Junior Gold).

Medalist for the 2014 USA IBC at the press conference Friday morning where the winners were announced. Front row left to right:  Ivan Duarte. Jinsol Eum, Taiyu He, Jeong Hansol, Byul Yun.  Back row left to right:  Paulina Guraieb Abella, Yasmin Lomondo, Gustavo Carvalho, Yui Shi, Aaron Smyth, Tamako Miyazaki, Gisele Bethea, Irina Sapozhnikova,  Mackenzie Richter, Shiori Kase, Ga-Yeon Jung.

2010 Competition 
The USA IBC returned to Jackson, Mississippi, from June 12 to 27, 2010. There were over 100 competitors from 36 countries. MSU art professor Brent Funderburk created the poster image for this event.

Medalist from the 2010 USA International Ballet Competition in Jackson, Mississippi.  This picture was taken at the news conference where the winners were announced on Friday, June 25, 2010.  Back row, left to right: Ki-Min Kim (S. Korea, Jr Silver), Zhang Xi (China, Sr Bronze), Marcelino Sambe (Portugal, Jr Gold), Kosuki Okumura (Japan, Sr Silver), Koyhei Yoshida (Japan, Sr Bronze).  Front row, left to right: Cao Shuci (China, Sr Gold), Ji-Young Chae (S Korea, Jr Gold), Derek Dunn (USA, Jr Bronze), Mariana Layun Prado (Mexico, Jr Bronze), Alys Sheep (Canada, Jr Silver), Fumi Kaneko (Japan, Jr Silver), Maki Onuki (Japan, Sr Bronze), Candice Adea (Philippines, Sr Silver).

2006 Competition
The USA IBC returned to Jackson, Mississippi for the eighth time from June 17 to July 2, 2006. There were over 110 dancers from 27 countries in the competition this year. 

Medalist from the 2006 USA International Ballet Competition in Jackson, Mississippi. This picture was taken at the news conference where the winners were announced on Friday, June 30, 2006. Back row, left to right: Mathias Dingman (USA, Jr., best couple), Joseph Gatti (USA, Sr Bronze), Isaac Hernandez (Mexico, Jr Gold), Denys Cherevychko (Ukraine, Sr Silver), Daniil Simkin (Germany, Sr Gold), Brooklyn Mack (USA, Sr Silver), unidentified male, Masayoshi Onuki (Japan, Sr Bronze), Davit Karapetyan. Front row, left to right: Yui Yonezawa (Japan, Sr Bronze), Jurgita Dronina (Lithuania, Sr Silver), Sasha De Sola (USA, Jr., best couple), Misa Kuranaga (Japan, Sr Gold), Kayo Sasabe (Japan, Jr Bronze), Christine Shevchenko (USA, Jr Bronze),  Sae-Eun Park (S Korea, Jr Silver), Jeffrey Cirio (USA, Jr Bronze), Vanessa Zahorian.)

2002 Competition
The USA IBC was again held in Jackson, Mississippi from June 15 to June 30, 2002.  

 
Medalist at the 2002 USA International Ballet Competition. Left to right: Yudai Fukuoka, Japan, Bronze; Sarah Kathryn Lane (light blue shirt), USA, Jr Silver;  Katia Carranza (dark blue shirt), Mexico, Bronze; unidentified female (back); Wu Haiyan (white shirt), China, Gold; unidentified male (black shirt); unidentified male (back); Sarah Lamb, USA, Silver; Danny Tidwell, USA, Jr, Silver; Joseph Phillips, Jr Gold; Mikhail Ilyin, Russa, Bronze.

Finalist at the 2002 USA International Ballet Competition. Left to right: Yudai Fukuoka, Japan, Bronze; unidentified female; unidentified female; unidentified female; unidentified male; Ashley Canterna, USA, Jury Award; unidentified female; Emi Hariyama, Japan, Robert Joffrey Award; unidentified female; Sergei Upkin, Estonia, Best Couple; Eve Andre, Estonia, Best Couple.

USA IBC Award winners 

Winners' information is from the USA IBC press releases posted on the USA IBC web site.  Note that you can click on the symbol in each column heading to sort the table by that column.

Table Notes:
J/S = Junior (15-18) or Senior (19-26).  NCP = Non-competing partner
M/F = Male or Female
Couple = won the best junior or senior couple award
Many of the links to the dancer's companies are no longer on-line. The comments reflect information available at the date indicated.

See also
 International Ballet Competition (disambiguation)
 Aspendos International Opera and Ballet Festival
 Canadian Ballet Festival
 International Ballet Festival of Havana

References

External links
  
  Thalia Mara
 2010 competition pictures by Richard Finkelstein

Ballet competitions
Culture of Jackson, Mississippi